These are the results from the open water swimming competition at the 1991 World Aquatics Championships, which took place in Perth, Western Australia.

Medal table

Medal summary

Men

Women

1991 in swimming
Open water swimming
Open water swimming at the World Aquatics Championships